Open Book is the second studio album from Scottish alternative rock band Fatherson and was released on 3 June 2016. The album includes the singles "Always", "Lost Little Boys" and "Just Past the Point of Breaking". The album marks the band's first release with their new label Easy Life/Sony Music UK.

Singles 
 "Always" was released as the album's lead single on 25 November 2015.
 "Lost Little Boys" was released as the album's second single on 9 February 2016.
 "Just Past the Point of Breaking" was released as the album's third single on 10 May 2016.

Critical reception 

Open Book was released following Fatherson's headline UK and highlands tour, with album launches occurring in Glasgow and London.

Track listing

Charts

Release history

References

External links 
 

2016 albums
Fatherson albums